This is a list of cemeteries in Latvia.

Riga
Bikernieki Memorial
Brothers' Cemetery
Forest Cemetery
Great Cemetery
 Martin Cemetery (Mārtiņa kapi), Riga
Pokrov Cemetery

References 

Latvia
 
Cemeteries